Eperiella is a genus of spiders in the family Anapidae. It was first described in 2010 by Rix & Harvey. , it contains 2 species.

References

Anapidae
Araneomorphae genera
Spiders of Australia
Spiders of South America